Seán Connick (born 27 August 1963) is a former Irish Fianna Fáil politician who served as Minister of State at the Department of Agriculture, Fisheries and Food with responsibility for Fisheries and Forestry from 2010 to 2011. He was a Teachta Dála (TD) for the Wexford constituency from 2007 to 2011.

Early and private life
Seán Connick is the son of John Connick and Margaret Ryan. Connick was educated at St. Canice's Primary School and CBS in New Ross. He also has a Professional Certificate in Business Management He uses a wheelchair as a result of a road traffic accident. Connick is a former motor trade administrator and health and fitness centre owner. He is a self-employed owner-manager of a Storage, Warehousing and Distribution Centre. Connick lives in Rosbercon, an area of New Ross town located in County Kilkenny.

Political career
Connick was elected to New Ross Town Council in 1999 and re-elected in 2004. He was elected to Wexford County Council in 2004. He was first elected to Dáil Éireann at the 2007 general election – receiving 9,826 first preference votes. He was the first person from New Ross to be elected as a TD. He was the first TD in the history of the state to use a wheelchair.

On 23 March 2010, he was appointed as Minister of State at the Department of Agriculture, Fisheries and Food with special responsibility for Fisheries and Forestry.

He lost his seat at the 2011 general election. He stood for election to Seanad Éireann on the Agricultural Panel in April 2011 but was not elected.

References

 

1963 births
Living people
Fianna Fáil TDs
Local councillors in County Wexford
Members of the 30th Dáil
Ministers of State of the 30th Dáil
People from New Ross
Politicians with paraplegia